This is a list of diplomatic missions of Mongolia. Mongolia's foreign policy was traditionally aligned with the Soviet bloc, giving due deference to its other significant neighbour, the People's Republic of China. It now has warmer ties with the West (it opened its Washington, D.C. mission in 1989), but Mongolia's comparatively small stature and isolation means it still has a modest network of diplomatic missions.

Africa

 Cairo (Embassy)

Americas

Ottawa (Embassy)

 Havana (Embassy)

Washington, D.C. (Embassy)
 Chicago (Consulate-General) 
 San Francisco (Consulate General)

Asia

 Beijing (Embassy)
 Hohhot (Consulate General)
 Hong Kong (Consulate General)
 Shanghai (Consulate General) 
 Erenhot (Consulate)
 Manzhouli (Consulate) 

 New Delhi (Embassy)

 Jakarta (Embassy)

 Tokyo (Embassy)
 Osaka (Consulate General) 

 Astana (Embassy)
 Almaty (Consulate)

Kuwait City (Embassy)

 Bishkek (Embassy)

 Vientiane (Embassy)

 Pyongyang (Embassy)

 Singapore (Embassy)

 Seoul (Embassy)
 Busan (Consulate)

 Taipei (Ulaanbaatar Trade and Economic Representative Office)

 Bangkok (Embassy)

 Ankara (Embassy)
 Istanbul (Consulate General)

 Abu Dhabi (Embassy)

 Hanoi (Embassy)

Europe

 Vienna (Embassy)

 Minsk (Embassy) 

 Brussels (Embassy)

 Sofia (Embassy)

 Prague (Embassy)

 Paris (Embassy)

 Berlin (Embassy)

 Budapest (Embassy)

Rome (Embassy) 

 Warsaw (Embassy)

 Moscow (Embassy)
 Irkutsk (Consulate-General)
 Kyzyl (Consulate-General)
 Ulan-Ude (Consulate-General)

 Stockholm (Embassy)

 Geneva (Embassy)

 Kyiv (Consulate)

 London (Embassy)

Oceania

 Canberra (Embassy)

Multilateral organisations
 
Brussels (Mission)
 
Geneva (Permanent Mission)
New York City (Permanent Mission)

Gallery

Closed missions

Americas

Asia

Europe

Embassies to Open
 (Tehran)

See also
 Foreign relations of Mongolia
 List of diplomatic missions in Mongolia
 Visa policy of Mongolia

References

 Mongolian Ministry of Foreign Affairs

 
Mongolia
Diplomatic missions